The Roman Catholic Archdiocese of Arequipa is an archdiocese located in the city of Arequipa in Peru. It was erected by Pope Gregory XIII on 15 April 1577 at the request of King Philip II of Spain.

History
15 April 1577: Established as Diocese of Arequipa from the Metropolitan Archdiocese of Lima
23 May 1943: Promoted as Metropolitan Archdiocese of Arequipa

Ordinaries

Diocese of Arequipa
Erected: 15 April 1577
Latin Name: Arequipensis
Metropolitan: Archdiocese of Lima

Antonio de Hervias, O.P. (15 Apr 1577 – 9 Jan 1579 Appointed, Bishop of Verapaz, Guatemala)
Cristóbal Rodríguez Juárez (Juárez), O.P. (16 Jan 1612 – 4 Nov 1613 Died), Archbishop (personal title)
Juan de las Cabezas Altamirano (16 Sep 1615 – 19 Dec 1615 Died)
Pedro de Perea (Pérez Díaz), O.S.A. (4 Sep 1617 – 1631 Died) 
Pedro de Villagómez Vivanco (2 Aug 1632 – 16 Jul 1640 Appointed, Archbishop of Lima)
Agustín de Ugarte y Sarabia (19 Nov 1640 – 21 Oct 1647 Appointed, Bishop of Quito, Ecuador)
Pedro de Ortega y Sotomayor (26 Dec 1647 – 27 Nov 1651 Appointed, Bishop of Cuzco)
Gaspar de Villarroel, O.S.A. (11 Dec 1651 – 27 Jan 1659 Appointed, Archbishop of La Plata o Charcas, Bolivia)
Juan de Almoguera, O.SS.T. (17 Feb 1659 – 27 Nov 1673 Appointed, Archbishop of Lima)
Juan de la Calle y Heredia, O. de M. (1 Oct 1674 – 15 Feb 1676 Died)
Antonio de León y Becerra (14 Jun 1677 – 28 Aug 1708 Died)
Juan de Argüelles, O.S.A. (21 Mar 1711 – 23 Jan 1712 Died)
Juan Otálora Bravo de Lagunas (19 Nov 1714 – 1722 Died) 
Juan Cavero de Toledo (11 Jun 1725 – 20 Mar 1741 Died) 
Juan Bravo del Rivero y Correa (28 Jan 1743 – 22 May 1752 Died) 
Juan González Melgarejo (26 Nov 1753 – 6 Mar 1754 Died) 
Jacinto Aguado y Chacón (17 Feb 1755 – 18 Jul 1763 Appointed, Bishop of Osma, Spain) 
Diego Salguero de Cabrera (18 Jul 1763 – 2 Dec 1769 Died) 
Manuel de Abad e Illanar, O. Praem. (17 Jun 1771 – 1 Feb 1780 Died) 
Miguel de Pamplona González Bassecourt, O.F.M. Cap. (10 Dec 1781 – 10 Dec 1784 Resigned) 
Pedro José Chávez de la Rosa (18 Dec 1786 – 9 May 1805 Resigned) 
Luis La Encina Díaz y Pereiro (9 Sep 1805 – 16 Jan 1816 Died) 
José Sebastian Goyeneche y Barreda (14 Apr 1817 – 26 Sep 1859 Confirmed, Archbishop of Lima) 
Bartolomé Manuel Herrera Vélez (26 Sep 1859 – 10 Aug 1864 Died) 
Juan de la Cruz Calienes Olazabal, O.F.M. (27 Mar 1865 – 26 Jun 1867 Died) 
José Benedicto Torres Romero (22 Jun 1868 – 8 Jan 1880 Died) 
Juan María Ambrosio Huerta Galván (20 Aug 1880 – 27 Jun 1897 Died) 
Manuel Segundo Ballón Manrique (24 Aug 1898 – 1906 Resigned) 
Mariano Emilio Holguin y Maldonado, O.F.M. (1 Jun 1906 – 24 Dec 1945 Died)

Archdiocese of Arequipa
Elevated: 23 May 1943
Leonardo José Rodriguez Ballón, O.F.M. (13 Jun 1946 – 26 Sep 1980 Resigned) 
Fernando Vargas Ruiz de Somocurcio, S.J. (26 Sep 1980 – 2 Mar 1996 Retired) 
Luis Sánchez-Moreno Lira (2 Mar 1996 – 29 Nov 2003 Retired) 
José Paulino Ríos Reynoso (29 Nov 2003 – 21 Oct 2006 Resigned) 
Javier Augusto Del Río Alba (21 Oct 2006 – )

Other affiliated bishops

Coadjutor bishops
Manuel Segundo Ballón Manrique (1896-1898)
Javier Augusto Del Río Alba (2006)

Auxiliary bishops
Juan Manuel Moscoso y Peralta (1770-1771), appointed Bishop of Córdoba (Tucumán), Argentina
Giuseppe Luca Barranco, O. de M. (1866), never consecrated
Daniel Figueroa Villón (1945-1946), appointed Bishop of Huancayo
José Germán Benavides Morriberón (1968-1976)
Lorenzo Unfried Gimpel, M.F.S.C. (1969-1980), appointed Prelate of Tarma
Felipe María Zalba Elizalde, O.P. (1980-1984), appointed Prelate of Chuquibamba
Raúl Antonio Chau Quispe (2019-)

Other priests of this diocese who became bishops
Santiago José O' Phelan Recabarren, appointed Bishop of Ayacucho o Huamanga (Guamanga) in 1841
Julián Ochoa Campos, appointed Bishop of Cuzco in 1864
Pedro José Chávez Ponce, appointed Bishop of Puno in 1875
Valentín Ampuero Núñez (priest here, 1894–1898), appointed Bishop of Puno in 1909
Juan Gualberto Guevara y de la Cuba, appointed Bishop of Trujillo in 1940
Pedro Alberto Bustamante López, appointed Prelate of Sicuani in 2013

Suffragan dioceses
 Diocese of Puno
 Diocese of Tacna y Moquegua
 Territorial Prelature of Ayaviri
 Territorial Prelature of Chuquibamba
 Territorial Prelature of Juli
 Territorial Prelature of Santiago Apóstol de Huancané

See also
Roman Catholicism in Peru

References

Arequipa
Roman Catholic dioceses in Peru
Roman Catholic Ecclesiastical Province of Arequipa
Religious organizations established in 1577
Roman Catholic dioceses established in the 16th century